Ethan Hawke is an American actor, writer and director who has received various awards and nominations throughout his career.

Hawke has been nominated for four Academy Awards, receiving two nominations for Best Adapted Screenplay, thanks to his writing contributions in Before Sunset (2004) and its sequel Before Midnight (2013), and two nominations for Best Supporting Actor, for his performances in the films Training Day (2001) and Boyhood (2014). The Before trilogy also earned him nominations at the Critics' Choice Movie Awards, Independent Spirit Awards and Writers Guild of America Awards, while the coming-of-age drama Boyhood garnered him further nominations for Best Supporting Actor at the British Academy Film Awards, Golden Globe Awards, Satellite Awards and Screen Actors Guild Awards. In 2018, he received critical acclaim for his performance as a Protestant minister in Paul Schrader's drama First Reformed, winning the Independent Spirit Award for Best Male Lead and being honored by several critics associations, including the London Film Critics' Circle, the Los Angeles Film Critics Association, the National Society of Film Critics and the New York Film Critics Circle.

In addition to his film work, Hawke has appeared in television series including The Good Lord Bird (2020), which earned him nominations for a Golden Globe Award, a Screen Actors Guild Award and a Writers Guild of America Award, and took part in the 2006 Broadway debut of Tom Stoppard's play The Coast of Utopia, receiving a nomination for the Tony Award for Best Featured Actor in a Play.

Awards and nominations

Notes

References

External links
  

Hawke, Ethan
Hawke, Ethan
Hawke, Ethan